Petra Nerger (born 13 July 1945) is a German former swimmer. She competed in the women's 100 metre backstroke at the 1964 Summer Olympics.

References

1945 births
Living people
German female swimmers
Olympic swimmers of the United Team of Germany
Swimmers at the 1964 Summer Olympics
Swimmers from Berlin